Polycardia is a genus of flowering plants belonging to the family Celastraceae.

Its native range is Madagascar.

Species:
 Polycardia aquifolium Tul. 
 Polycardia lateralis O.Hoffm. 
 Polycardia libera O.Hoffm. 
 Polycardia phyllanthoides Lam.

References

Celastraceae
Celastrales genera